Systena hudsonias, the black-headed flea beetle, is a species of flea beetle in the family Chrysomelidae. It is found in North America. It is poliphagos, it feeds on plants of seventeen different plant families.

References

Further reading

 
 

Alticini
Articles created by Qbugbot
Beetles described in 1771
Beetles of North America